Sandhurst (initially Sandhurst Boroughs) was an electoral district of the Legislative Assembly in the Australian state of Victoria from 1856 to 1904. It was based on the towns of Sandhurst 
(now Bendigo) and Lockwood.

The district was defined as: 

From 1904, Sandhurst was split into two districts, Bendigo West and Bendigo East.

The district of Sandhurst Boroughs was one of the initial districts of the first Victorian Legislative Assembly, 1856.

Members for Sandhurst
One member 1856 to 1859, two from 1859.

      * Bailes was later member for Bendigo East  (1904 to 1907).

References

Former electoral districts of Victoria (Australia)
1856 establishments in Australia
1904 disestablishments in Australia